Jane Kelly may refer to:

Jane Kelly (artist) (born 1956), English artist
Jane L. Kelly (born 1964), American judge
Jane Kelley (20th century), American politician